The men's kumite +84 kg  competition at the 2015 European Games in Baku, Azerbaijan was held on 14 June 2015 at the Crystal Hall.

Schedule
All times are Azerbaijan Summer Time (UTC+5).

Results
Legend
KK — Forfeit (Kiken)

Elimination round

Group A

Group B

Finals

References

External links

Men's kumite +84 kg